The 2016 Beach Handball World Championships was a twelve-team tournament in both men's and women's beach handball, held at Budapest, Hungary from 12 to 17 July 2016. It was the seventh edition of the event.

Croatia and Spain took home gold in the men's and women's event, both after defeating Brazil in the final.

Format
The twelve teams were split into two groups of six teams. After playing a round-robin, the three top ranked team advanced to the main round. Every team kept the points from preliminary round matches against teams who also advance. In the main round every team had three games against the opponents they did not face in the preliminary round. The top four teams advanced to the semifinals. The three bottom ranked team from each preliminary round group were packed into one group. The points won against the teams who were also in this group were valid. Every team played three games and after those round there were placement matches from 7th–12th place.

Matches were played in sets, the team that wins two sets is the winner of a match. When teams were equal in points the head-to-head result was decisive.

Draw
The draw was held on 12 May 2016. The schedule was released on 16 June 2016.

Seeding
Men

Women

Referees
Following 8 referee pairs were selected for the championship:

Men
All times are local (UTC+2).

Preliminary round

Group A

Group B

Main round
Points obtained against teams from the same group are carried over.

Consolation round
Points obtained against teams from the same group are carried over.

Placement matches

Eleventh place game

Ninth place game

Seventh place game

Fifth place game

Knockout stage

Final ranking

Awards
MVP
 Ivan Jurić

Topscorer
 Anis Zouaoui (126 points)

All-star team
Goalkeeper:  Mohsin Yafai
Right wing:  Nailson Amaral
Left wing:  Ivan Jurić
Pivot:  Attila Kun
Defender:  Hagi Toure
Specialist:  Bruno Oliveira

Fair play award

Women

Preliminary round

Group A

Group B

Main round
Points obtained against teams from the same group are carried over.

Consolation round
Points obtained against teams from the same group are carried over.

Placement matches

Eleventh place game

Ninth place game

Seventh place game

Fifth place game

Knockout stage

Final ranking

Awards
MVP
 Camila Souza

Topscorer
 Fruzsina Kretz (99 points)

All-star team
Goalkeeper:  Regina Gulbrandsen
Right wing:  Raquel Caño
Left wing:  Nathalie Sena
Pivot:  Renata Santiago
Defender:  María García
Specialist:  Renáta Csiki

Fair play award

References

External links
Official website

Beach World Championships
2016 Beach Handball World Championships
Beach Handball World Championships
Beach Handball World Championships